Arthur FitzGerald Kinnaird, 10th Lord Kinnaird (8 July 1814 – 26 April 1887), was a Scottish banker and Liberal politician.

Early life and interests
Kinnaird was a younger son of Charles Kinnaird, 8th Lord Kinnaird, and Lady Olivia Letitia Catherine, daughter of William FitzGerald, 2nd Duke of Leinster.

He rose to become managing partner of Ransom, Bouverie & Co., a banking firm. He continued in this role once he was elected to Parliament. In 1868, he was elected as President of the National Bible Society of Scotland after the resignation of George Campbell, 8th Duke of Argyll.

He was a keen farmer and, in 1862, installed a Turkish bath for cattle at his Millhill Farm at Inchture, raising the temperature higher than usual, and successfully using it in the treatment of distemper.

Political career

Kinnaird sat as Member of Parliament for Perth from 1837 to 1839 and again from 1852 to 1878 for the Whigs. He was an avid supporter of Prime Minister Henry John Temple, 3rd Viscount Palmerston, which led to him being nicknamed "Palmerston's shadow". During his time in office, he was known for his desire to seek more representation for Scotland within Parliament. In 1878 he succeeded his elder brother in the Scottish lordship as well as in the barony of Kinnaird, and took his seat in the House of Lords.

Lord Kinnaird married Mary Jane (Hoare) Kinnaird (1816–1888), daughter of William Henry Hoare, in 1843. They had seven children out of whom six grew to adulthood: Frederica Georgina (1845–1929), Arthur Fitzgerald (1847–1923), Louisa Elizabeth (1848–1926), Agneta Olivia (1850–1940), Gertrude Mary (1853–1931), and Emily Cecilia (1855–1947). They settled in London and every Wednesday they would invite discussion on philanthropic projects. They raised funds for the Lock Hospital and Asylum which she and her husband supported. He was a strong supporter of women's suffrage, but his wife felt that this was not in keeping with her idea of a woman's role. She did not speak in public but it is speculated that she wrote his speeches.

In 1847, Kinnaird represented the British Association for the Relief of Distress in Ireland and the Highlands of Scotland, in distributing relief to the Scottish poor. He was treasurer of the Highland Emigration Fund

In 1856 he and their five children went to live above the bank where he worked in Pall Mall East. This new home became another centre for good works.

Lord Kinnaird died in April 1887, aged 72, and was succeeded by his eldest son, Arthur Fitzgerald. Lady Kinnaird died the following year.

See also
 Lord Kinnaird
 Peter Maning, The origins and early history of Barclays Bank in Pall Mall, London. 1985

References

External links 

 The Thirteen Lord Kinnairds, Kinnaird.net
 
 Representative Peers - Scotland

1814 births
1887 deaths
Members of the Parliament of the United Kingdom for Scottish constituencies
Scottish Liberal Party MPs
Younger sons of barons
UK MPs 1837–1841
UK MPs 1852–1857
UK MPs 1857–1859
UK MPs 1859–1865
UK MPs 1865–1868
UK MPs 1868–1874
UK MPs 1874–1880
UK MPs who inherited peerages
Lords of Parliament